Argyreia nervosa is a perennial climbing vine native to the Indian subcontinent and introduced to numerous areas worldwide, including Hawaii, Africa, and the Caribbean. Though it can be invasive, it is often prized for its aesthetic and medicinal value. Common names include Hawaiian baby woodrose, adhoguda अधोगुडा or vidhara विधारा (Sanskrit), elephant creeper and woolly morning glory. Its seeds are known for their powerful entheogenic properties, greater or similar to those of Ipomoea species, with users reporting significant psychedelic and spiritual experiences. The two botanical varieties are A. n. var. nervosa described here, and A. n. var. speciosa, which are used in Ayurvedic medicine for their medicinal value.

Argyreia nervosa seeds contain various ergoline alkaloids such as ergine. A study reported stereoisomers of ergine to be found in the seeds at a concentration of 0.325% of dry weight. A more recent study reported presence of ergometrine, lysergol, lysergic acid and other alkaloids that contribute to its pharmacological effects.

History
While several other plants in the family Convolvulaceae, such as  Ipomoea corymbosa (ololiuhqui) and Ipomoea tricolor (tlitliltzin), were used in shamanic rituals of Latin America for centuries, A. nervosa was not traditionally used for this purpose. Its properties were first brought to attention in the 1960s.

Cultivation 
Where temperatures fall below 13 °C (55 °F), Argyreia nervosa is grown in a warm greenhouse. Elsewhere, it is grown on arbours, pergolas, walls, or trees. It is often grown professionally under glass in a loam-based potting compost (John Innes No. 3) in full light, and watered freely from spring to autumn, with a balanced liquid fertilizer applied monthly and reduced water in winter. It is grown outdoors in moderately fertile, moist but well-drained soil in full sun. Pruning is done in late winter.

Glycosides

Argyroside, (24R)-ergost-5-en-11-oxo-3β-ol-α-D-glucopyranoside, a steroidal glycoside unique to Argyreia nervosa

Ergolines

Hydroxycinnamic acids

Fatty acids

Entheogen

Certain New Age sources claim that, according to 'various oral histories'  Huna shamans used the powdered seeds to prepare an entheogenic drink. This is unlikely to reflect an authentic practice having once formed a part of traditional Hawaiian Religion, given that Huna has been widely discredited as a culturally appropriative New Age religion invented by Max Freedom Long. The seeds of Argyreia nervosa can produce  psychoactive effects, but it has not yet been demonstrated satisfactorily that their use as an entheogen predates the various countercultural movements of the 1960s.
Given that A. nervosa is not native to Hawaii, having been introduced there from India, any Hawaiian practices involving it are unlikely to be of any antiquity. It cannot, however, be ruled out that the plant may have been utilised as an intoxicant in its native India at some time in the past, although evidence for this (if present) has not yet come to light.
The seeds of A. nervosa contain ergot alkaloids varying considerably in concentration with LSA weight ranging between exactly similar looking seeds from 3 μg to 34 μg (avg 17 μg). However, in its effects, LSA is about one tenth as potent as its cousin LSD, making a threshold dose level for LSA about 500 μg. The psychoactive effects of the seeds may therefore be due to other alkaloids present in them and the safe and effective dose may be difficult to predict.

Uses in the traditional medicine of India
While he does not claim there to be any evidence for the use of the seeds  of A. nervosa as a traditional entheogen in its native India, Christian Rätsch does describe some interesting traditional uses of the root of the plant in Ayurveda somewhat suggestive of effects upon the CNS:

The root is regarded as a tonic for the nerves and brain and is ingested as a rejuvenation tonic and aphrodisiac to increase intelligence. 
Other traditional uses are in the treatment of gonorrhea, strangury, chronic ulcers, diabetes, anemia, and cerebral disorders. The plant is also used as appetizer, brain tonic, cardiotonic, and aphrodisiac. It possesses anti-inflammatory, immunomodulatory, antibacterial, antiviral, and antifungal activities

References

External links

 PLANTS database entry
 

nervosa
Decorative fruits and seeds
Entheogens
Flora of the Indian subcontinent
Herbal and fungal hallucinogens
Natural sources of lysergamides
Medicinal plants of Asia
Soma (drink)
Plants described in 1837
Taxa named by Wenceslas Bojer
Taxa named by Nicolaas Laurens Burman